Prarthana Behere (born 5 January 1983) is an Indian actress who works in Hindi television and Hindi and Marathi films. She starts her career at 16 and is known for her role in the Hindi television show Pavitra Rishta as Vaishali Manohar Karanjkar. She is the winner of 9X Jhakaas Heroine Hunt Season 1. She debuted on Marathi television in 2021 playing Neha Kamat in Zee Marathi's Mazhi Tuzhi Reshimgath.

Career 
She started her career with the Marathi film Rita in 2009. She got featured in the Marathi film Mai Lek as Leelavati in the year 2010. She debuted in television with Zee TV's Pavitra Rishta playing the role of Vaishali in 2009. She made her Bollywood film debut with Love U... Mr. Kalakaar!  in 2011 as Kamya. In the same year, she appeared in a supporting role in  Bodyguard.

She made her lead Marathi film in Jai Maharashtra Dhaba Bhatinda as a Punjabi girl Jaspinder Kaur in 2013. After that, she appeared in commercially successful films such as Mitwaa (2015), Coffee Ani Barach Kahi (2015), Vakratunda Mahakaaya (2015), Mr. and Mrs. Sadachari (2016), Fugay (2017) and Ti & Ti (2020).

Currently, she is playing a lead role in Zee Marathi's Mazhi Tuzhi Reshimgath.

Personal life
Behere was born on 5 January 1983 in Vadodara, Gujarat in a Marathi family. She married film director and writer, Abhishek Jawkar in November 2017 in Goa.

Filmography

Feature films

Television

References

External links

 

 

1983 births
Living people
Actresses in Hindi cinema
Actresses in Marathi cinema
Indian film actresses
Indian soap opera actresses
21st-century Indian actresses
Marathi actors
People from Vadodara